Zee Mundo is a 24-hour Spanish-language Bollywood movie pay television channel. It is part of Zee Entertainment Enterprises.

Launched in September 2016, Zee Mundo brings HD Bollywood movies to Latino audiences, dubbed in Spanish.

As of 2021, Zee Mundo is available within the United States of America on  Xumo and VEMOX, and has planned to expand to more US and Latin American affiliates and consumers.

References

External links 
 

Spanish-language television stations
Zee Entertainment Enterprises
Movie channels
Television channels and stations established in 2016